Barfuß ins Bett (Barefoot in Bed) is an East German family television series, broadcast in 14 parts between 1988 to 1990. The first season was directed by Peter Wekwerth and the second season by Horst Zaeske, the screenplay was written by Ingrid Föhr.

Plot
At the center of the story is the senior physician Dr. Hans Schön (Jörg Panknin), who lives alone after the death of his wife. In addition to his mother, his household includes two sons. The younger son Robert falls ill with rubella and infects his pregnant kindergarten teacher Josi (Renate Blume) This is how Dr. Schön loves Josi. The two get married in the first episode, and further problems arise, first with Schön's mother and later (in the second season) with regard to family problems.

See also
List of German television series

External links
 

1988 German television series debuts
1990 German television series endings
German-language television shows
Television in East Germany